San Miguel Airport is an airport  east of Romeral, a town in the Maule Region of Chile.

The runway has an additional  of unpaved overrun on the west end.

See also

Transport in Chile
List of airports in Chile

References

External links
OpenStreetMap - San Miguel
OurAirports - San Miguel
FallingRain - San Miguel Airport

Airports in Chile
Airports in Maule Region